András Fejes (born 26 August 1988, in Székesfehérvár) is a Hungarian football player who currently plays for III. Kerületi TVE.

Club statistics

References

Profile at HLSZ

1988 births
Living people
Sportspeople from Székesfehérvár
Hungarian footballers
Association football defenders
Fehérvár FC players
FC Felcsút players
Puskás Akadémia FC players
BFC Siófok players
MTK Budapest FC players
Paksi FC players
Győri ETO FC players
Nemzeti Bajnokság I players
Nemzeti Bajnokság II players